Xystophora chengchengenis is a moth of the family Gelechiidae. It was described by Hou-Hun Li and Zhe-Min Zheng in 1998. It is found in Shaanxi, China.

References

Moths described in 1998
Xystophora